The South African Political Party (SAPP) is a minor South African political party based in Mmabatho, North West province.

It contested the provincial elections in the North West in 2009, 2014 and 2019, failing to win a seat and suffering a reduction in vote share on each occasion.

Election results

Provincial elections

! rowspan=2 | Election
! colspan=2 | Eastern Cape
! colspan=2 | Free State
! colspan=2 | Gauteng
! colspan=2 | Kwazulu-Natal
! colspan=2 | Limpopo
! colspan=2 | Mpumalanga
! colspan=2 | North-West
! colspan=2 | Northern Cape
! colspan=2 | Western Cape
|-
! % !! Seats
! % !! Seats
! % !! Seats
! % !! Seats
! % !! Seats
! % !! Seats
! % !! Seats
! % !! Seats
! % !! Seats
|-
! 2009
| - || -
| - || -
| - || -
| - || -
| - || -
| - || -
| 0.17% || 0/33
| - || -
| - || -
|-
! 2014
| - || -
| - || -
| - || -
| - || -
| - || -
| - || -
| 0.06% || 0/33
| - || -
| - || -
|-
! 2019
| - || -
| - || -
| - || -
| - || -
| - || -
| - || -
| 0.04% || 0/33
| - || -
| - || -
|}

References

Political parties in South Africa